The 2020–21 Baylor Bears basketball team represented Baylor University in the 2020–21 NCAA Division I men's basketball season. The Bears, members of the Big 12 Conference, played their home games at the Ferrell Center in Waco, Texas. They were led by 18th-year head coach Scott Drew.

The 2020–21 season was the greatest season in Baylor's 115-year basketball history. They finished the season 28–2, 13–1 in Big 12 play to win their first regular season championship of any sort since 1950. In the Big 12 tournament, they defeated Kansas State in the quarterfinals before losing to Oklahoma State in the semifinals. They received an at-large bid to the NCAA tournament as the No. 1 seed in the South region. The Bears defeated Hartford and Wisconsin to advance to the Sweet Sixteen. They defeated Villanova and Arkansas to advance to the school's first Final Four since 1950. In the Final Four, they defeated Houston to advance to the school's second National Championship Game. In the championship, they defeated No. 1 overall seed Gonzaga to win the school's first National Championship.

Previous season
The Bears finished the season 2019–20 season 26–4 and 15–3 in Big 12 play to finish in second place. The team was scheduled to play Kansas State in the quarterfinals of the Big 12 tournament before the tournament was canceled due to the ongoing COVID-19 pandemic. The NCAA tournament was also canceled due to the pandemic.

Offseason

Departures

Incoming transfers

Recruiting classes

2020 recruiting class

2021 Recruiting class

Preseason

Big 12 coaches' poll
The Big 12 preseason coaches' poll was released on October 29, 2020. Baylor was predicted to come in first place.

Roster

Schedule and results
The Bears' initial schedule included participation in the Empire Classic at Mohegan Sun Arena in Uncasville, Connecticut, where they would have played Arizona State on November 25, followed by either Villanova or Boston College on November 26; however, the Bears were forced to withdraw after Scott Drew announced he had tested positive for COVID-19. The Bears were likewise forced to cancel their game scheduled for November 29 against Seton Hall.

|-
!colspan=12 style=| Regular Season

|-
!colspan=12 style=| Big 12 Tournament

|-
!colspan=12 style=| NCAA tournament

source:

Rankings

^Coaches did not release a Week 1 poll.

See also
2020–21 Big 12 Conference men's basketball season
2020–21 NCAA Division I men's basketball season
2020–21 Baylor Lady Bears basketball team

References

Baylor
Baylor Bears men's basketball seasons
Baylor
Baylor
Baylor
NCAA Division I men's basketball tournament Final Four seasons
NCAA Division I men's basketball tournament championship seasons